Elachista olschwangi is a moth of the family Elachistidae that can be found in Russia (the Southern Ural Mountains).

The wingspan is 10–11.4 mm. The forewing ground colour is creamy white, scattered with raised dark grey tipped scales. There are four indistinctly delimited transverse ochreous brown fasciae across forewings. The hindwings are dark grey with ochreous grey fringe scales.

References

olschwangi
Moths described in 2003
Endemic fauna of Russia
Moths of Europe